Yaar is an autobiographical book by Nepali writer Nayan Raj Pandey. It is the first autobiographical work of the writer whose previous books, Loo and Ulaar have been widely popular among Nepali readers. The book was published on January 13, 2018 by FinePrint Publication. The author had been prominent in Nepali literature field for three decades at the time of publication of the book.

Background 
The book depicts the journey of the author from his youthful days to being an established Nepali writer. The book chronicles the memories of his days in media and literature. The book is dedicated to his wife and his friends.

Release 
The book was launched on the premises of Nepal Academy, Kamaladi and was hosted by Shivani Singh Tharu.

Award 
The book won the Padmashree Sahitya Puraskar for the year 2074 BS (2018). It was also shortlisted for the prestigious Madan Puraskar for the same year.

See also 

 Sallipir
 Khusi
 Jiwan Kada Ki Phool
 Antarmanko Yatra
 Singha Durbarko Ghumne Mech

References 

2018 non-fiction books
21st-century Nepalese books
21st-century Nepalese literature
Nepalese autobiographies
Nepalese books
Books by Nayan Raj Pandey
Padmashree Sahitya Puraskar-winning works